The Max Planck Institute for Comparative and International Private Law (Max-Planck-Institut für ausländisches und internationales Privatrecht, MPIPRIV) is a legal research institute located in Hamburg, Germany. It is operated by the Max Planck Society. Founded in 1949, it is the successor institution of the Kaiser Wilhelm Institute for Foreign and International Private Law, which was founded in 1926. Since 1956 it has been based in Hamburg's district of Rotherbaum.

See also 
 Max Planck Society
 University of Hamburg

References 

Comparative and International Private Law
Legal research institutes
Organisations based in Hamburg
Buildings and structures in Eimsbüttel